Coliseo Polideportivo is an indoor arena located in Lima, Peru that is under construction.  It was scheduled to be completed in July 2011, and have a seating capacity of 11,320 spectators. It will host some matches for the 2011 FIVB Women's Junior World Championship. but this work was never carried out, in its place it was built the National Sports Village: VIDENA in 2019.

References

Proposed sports venues
Sports venues in Lima